Xinyu North railway station is a railway station of Hangchangkun Passenger Railway located in Yushui District, Xinyu, Jiangxi, People's Republic of China.

Railway stations in Jiangxi
Xinyu